Feu! Chatterton is a French pop/rock band from Paris formed in 2011. Their name is an homage to the poet Thomas Chatterton. In 2015, they released their first album, the critically-acclaimed Ici le jour (a tout enseveli), having previously released the EPs Feu! Chatterton (2014)
and Bic Medium (2015). They followed it with L'Oiseleur in 2018 and Palais d'argile in 2021. The band is composed of Antoine Wilson (bass), Arthur Teboul (vocals), Clément Doumic (guitars and keyboards), Raphaël De Pressigny (drums), and Sébastien Wolf (guitars and keyboards).

Band members
 Antoine Wilson – bass
 Arthur Teboul – vocals
 Clément Doumic – guitars, keyboards
 Raphaël De Pressigny – drums
 Sébastien Wolf – guitars, keyboards

Discography
Studio albums
 Ici le Jour (a tout enseveli) (fr) (2015)
 L'Oiseleur (fr) (2018)
 Palais d'argile (2021)

EPs
 Feu! Chatterton (2014)
 Bic Medium (2015)

Live albums
 Feu! Chatterton Live 2018 (2019)

References

External links
 
 Feu! Chatterton at Universal Music

French rock music groups
Musical groups from Paris
Musical groups established in 2011
2011 establishments in France